Steven Lindsay (born 1964), better known as "Tiger" Lindsay, is a Canadian outlaw biker and gangster involved in an important legal case to the Hells Angels Motorcycle Club declared a criminal organization in Canada.

Para-Dice Riders
Lindsay joined the Para-Dice Riders outlaw biker club in 1987. He was known as one of the more violent members of the Para-Dice Riders, being described by George Coussens of the Ontario Provincial Police (OPP)'s Anti-Biker Enforcement Unit as: "he's a big, intimidating person, well respected by all the bikers". Lindsay along with his common-law wife were the co-owners of a bar in Woodbridge while he also worked as a bouncer at the Red Pepper bar. The journalists Julian Sher and William Marsden wrote: "Over six feet tall and weighing about 230 pounds, Lindsay looked almost like a Viking". Lindsay shaved the sides of his head bald, kept the rest of his reddish blonde hair in a ponytail and had a pointed beard that went down to his chest. One man who knew Lindsay who did wish to be named told Sher and Marsden: "He'd kick your ass as soon as look at you. He was tough, he talked tough".

Hells Angels
In 2000, the Hells Angels national president Walter "Nurget" Stadnick offered the Ontario biker gangs the chance to join the Hells Angels on a "patch-for-patch" basis, allowing to join the Hells Angels with patches equivalent to their current patches. On 29 December 2000, Lindsay along with the rest of the Para-Dice Riders joined the Hells Angels. At the ceremony at the clubhouse of the Hells Angels "mother chapter" in Sorel, Lindsay burned his Para-Dice Rider jacket and put on a jacket with the Hells Angels death head patch. At the ceremony, Lindsay saw Coussens, stepped in front of him, and told him: "How ya doin', George?"

On 23 January 2002, Lindsay along with Raymond Bonner visited the home of a black-market satellite dealer in Barrie. Lindsay was unhappy with the dish the dealer had sold for the Hells Angels clubhouse in Woodbridge. Both Angels had arrived at the man's house wearing their death head patches and demanded the dealer pay them $75,000 as a "tax" to be allowed to continue his work. Lindsay was dressed in boots saying "Hells Angels North Toronto", wore a belt saying "Hells Angels", a T-shirt saying "Hells Angels Singen" (a reference to a Hells Angels chapter in Germany) and a necklace whose pendant was the Hells Angels death head. Instead of paying, the dealer contacted the police and wore a wire when Lindsay and Bonner returned. The wire recorded Lindsay as making threats and saying to pay the $75,000 because the money belonged to him plus "five other guys that are fucking the same kind of motherfucker as I am". Lindsay was recorded as saying the dealer's "days were numbered”, that "he was in trouble", and finally that was "lucky to be standing there”. The fact that Lindsay was speaking not as an individual, but as representing the Hells Angels led the police to charge him on 31 January 2002 with gangsterism.

At the same time, the police started an investigation of Lindsay who had gone into business with Juan Ramon Fernandez, a twice deported Spanish man who served as the Rizzuto family's agent for Ontario. On 29 January 2002, Fernandez told Lindsay he much preferred to do business with the Nomad chapter, whose members almost were all arrested as a result of Operation Springtime and felt that Vito Rizzuto should have imposed a truce in the Quebec biker war much earlier than when he actually did in September 2000. Lindsay then launched a violent rant against Toronto mayor Mel Lastman for turning his back on the Hells Angels after he was photographed shaking hands with one of them. Lindsay then told Fernandez that he had beaten up someone who owned the Hells Angels money. Fernandez then said he was thinking about Constantin "Big Gus" Alevizos killed, saying he would have Pietro Scarcella kill Alevizos for the Rizzuto family.

C-95 conviction
In September 2004, Lindsay and Bonner were convicted of extortion along with gangsterism, making the first time that any Hells Angels had been convicted of the charge. Justice Micelle Fuerst in convicting Lindsay and Bonner wrote that: "Both Mr. Lindsay and Mr. Bonner went to the victim's house wearing jackets bearing the primary symbols of the HAMC [Hells Angels Motorcycle Club], the name 'Hells Angels', and the death head logo. They presented themselves not as individuals, but as members of a group with a reputation for violence and intimidation. They deliberately invoked their membership in the HAMC with the intent to inspire fear in the victim. They committed extortion with the intent to do so in association with a criminal organization, the HAMC to which they belonged". The ruling was notable as the first convictions under the C-95 law, which created the new offense of gangsterism, which was defined as committing crimes on behalf of a criminal organization and was the first time that the courts had ever declared that the Hells Angels are a criminal organization that merely masquerade as a motorcycle club. Fuerst's ruling that an additional penalty of 14 years in prison could be imposed on Hells Angels for crimes committed on behalf of their group was considered to be a major blow against the Hells Angels. Lindsay launched an appeal of the verdict, claimg that the C-95 law was unconstitutional and violated his rights. On 29 September 2005, Lindsay was sentenced to four years in prison.

In April 2008, Lindsay was sent to prison after he violated his bail conditions by living outside of Barrie. On 2 July 2009, the Ontario Court of Appeals upheld Justice Fuerst's ruling. The Court of Appeal ruled: "Put bluntly, the trial judge’s reasoning on this issue was impeccable and her conclusion is the antithesis of unreasonableness". The Lindsay case was considered significant because the case been decided in his favor, the C-95 law would have been struck down as unconstitutional.

Books

References

Living people
1964 births
21st-century Canadian criminals
Canadian male criminals
Canadian gangsters
Extortionists
Canadian prisoners and detainees
Prisoners and detainees of Canada
Hells Angels